= Rein Dool =

Dutch artist

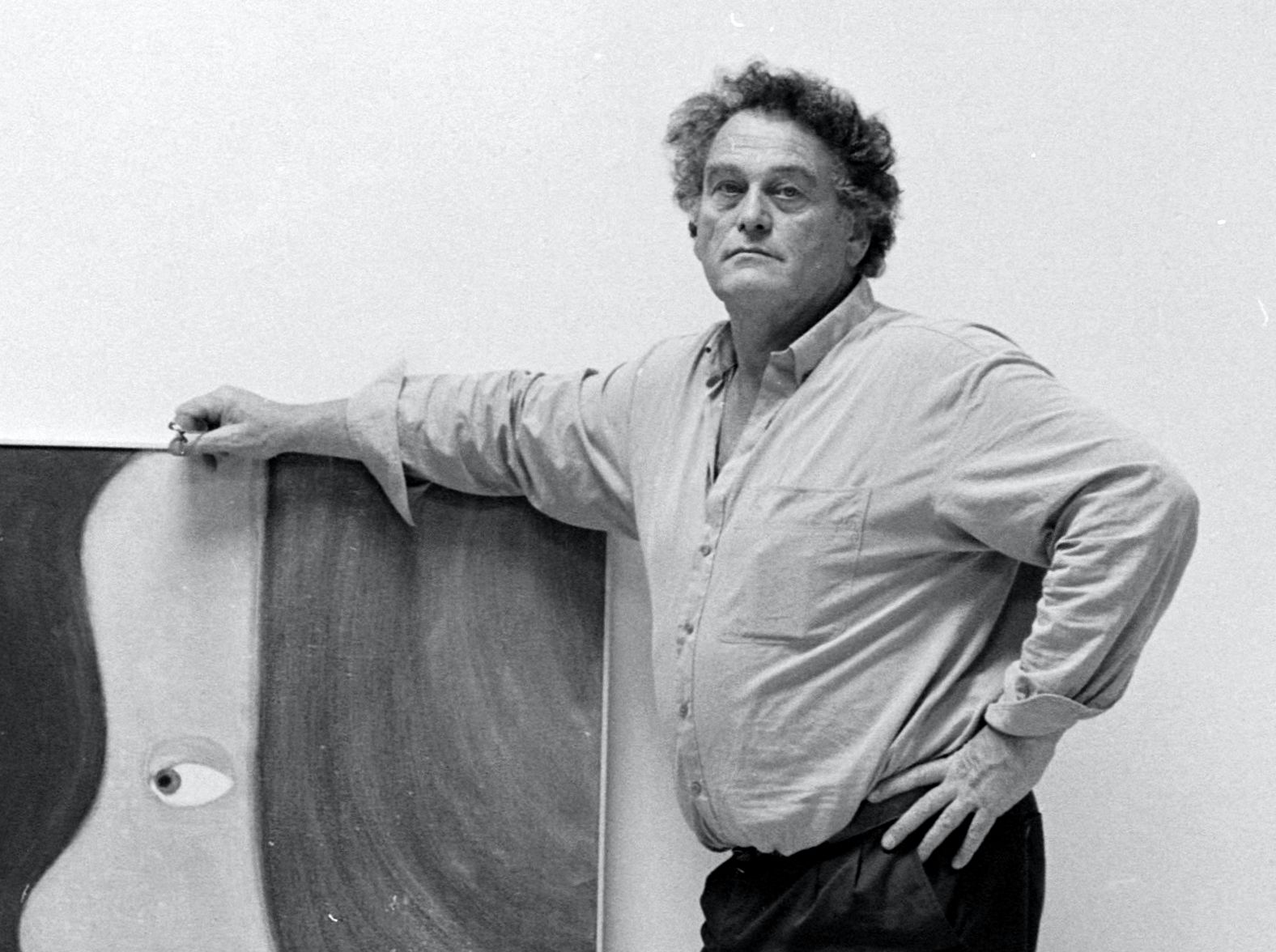
Dool in 1993

Rein Dool (born 1933) is a Dutch artist.

Dool was born in Leiden in 1933.

Dool trained at the Amsterdam Graphic School and later went to work as a lithographer. He is a self-taught artist who first started exhibiting in 1951. He decided to pursue a career in the visual arts around 1960.

In December 2022, the unannounced removal of a 1970s Dool painting at Leiden University of senior male staff smoking cigars has raised questions of cancel culture.
